Royal Daring Hockey Club Molenbeek, commonly known as Royal Daring or simply Daring, is a Belgian field hockey club based in Molenbeek-Saint-Jean, Brussels. Both the first men's and women's team play in the highest division of Belgian hockey.

The hockey club Royal Daring was founded on 14 May 1922 as part of the football club R. Daring Club Molenbeek. The men's team have won the Belgian title four times from 1945 until 1949. The men's team reached the semi-finals of the Euro Hockey League in the 2014–15 season.

Honours
Men's Belgian Hockey League
 Winners (4): 1945–46, 1946–47, 1947–48, 1948–49

Current squad

References

External links 
 

 
Belgian field hockey clubs
Molenbeek-Saint-Jean
Sport in Brussels
1922 establishments in Belgium
Field hockey clubs established in 1922